Thomas "Tom" Carr (birth unknown)is a professional rugby league footballer who has played in the 2010s. He has played at club level for Featherstone Rovers (Heritage № 943), York City Knights, Whitehaven, and Doncaster.

Playing career
Thomas Carr made his début for Featherstone Rovers on Thursday 4 March 2010.

References

External links
RFL fines trio for abuse of referees on social media networks
Challenge Cup: Catalan (sic) Dragons 92-8 York

Living people
Doncaster R.L.F.C. players
English rugby league players
Featherstone Rovers players
Place of birth missing (living people)
Whitehaven R.L.F.C. players
Year of birth missing (living people)
York City Knights players